Robert Duncan Drewe (born 9 January 1943)  is an Australian novelist, non-fiction and short story writer.

Biography

Robert Drewe was born on 9 January 1943 in Melbourne, Victoria. At the age of six, he moved with his family to Perth. He grew up on the West Australian coast and was educated at Hale School.

He joined The West Australian as a cadet reporter. Three years later he was recruited by The Age, where he became Sydney chief at the age of 21, later Literary Editor of The Australian. He was a columnist, features editor and special writer on The Australian and The Bulletin.

Drewe won two Walkley Awards for journalism while working for The Bulletin.
He was awarded a Leader Grant travel scholarship by the United States Government.

During the 1970s he turned from journalism to writing fiction, beginning with The Savage Crows in 1976, followed by A Cry in the Jungle Bar, The Bodysurfers, Fortune, The Bay of Contented Men, Our Sunshine, The Drowner, Grace and The Rip, as well as a prize-winning memoir, The Shark Net, and the non-fiction Walking Ella.

Fortune won the fiction category of the National Book Council Award, The Bay of Contented Men won a Commonwealth Writers' Prize for the best book in Australasia and South-East Asia, and The Drowner made Australian literary history by becoming the first novel to win the Premier's Literary Prize in every state. It also won the Australian Book of the Year Prize, the Adelaide Festival Prize for literature and was voted one of the ten best international novels of the decade. The Shark Net won the Western Australian Premier's Prize for Non-Fiction, the Courier Mail Book of the Year Prize and the Vision Australia Award.

Our Sunshine was made into a 2003 film, retitled Ned Kelly, directed by Gregor Jordan and starring Heath Ledger, Orlando Bloom and Naomi Watts. The Shark Net was adapted for an ABC-BBC-produced international television mini-series and a BBC radio drama. The Bodysurfers also became a successful ABC and BBC TV mini-series and was adapted for radio and the theatre.

Drewe was also the editor of two short-story anthologies, The Penguin Book of the Beach and The Penguin Book of the City, and edited Best Australian Stories in 2006 and 2007 and Best Australian Essays in 2010. He has been a Sydney Morning Herald film critic, and his play, South American Barbecue, was first performed at Sydney's Belvoir Street Theatre in 1991.

Awarded a special Australian arts scholarship  by the then Prime Minister, Paul Keating. He has also received an honorary doctorate in literature from the University of Queensland, and an honorary doctorate of letters from the University of Western Australia. He has been writer-in-residence at the University of Western Australia, La Trobe University in Melbourne, the Southbank Centre at Royal Festival Hall, London, and at HM Prison Brixton in London.

He has served as a member of the Literature Board of the Australia Council and the management committees of the Australian Society of Authors, the Sydney Writers' Festival and the Byron Bay Writers Festival.

In 2019 Drewe won the Colin Roderick Award for his book The True Colour of the Sea. The True Colour of the Sea was also shortlisted for the 2019 University of Southern Queensland Steele Rudd Award for a Short Story Collection at the Queensland Literary Awards.

Critical responses

Literature and Journalism: The Fiction of Robert Drewe – 1989 by Bruce Bennett

Robert Drewe is the author of three novels, The Savage Crows (1976), A Cry in the Jungle Bar (1979), and Fortune (1986), together with a book of stories The Bodysurfers (1983) and a forthcoming collection to be called The Bay of Contented Men. Drewe was a journalist for ten years between the ages of 18 and 28 before he determined to be a full-time fiction writer. He had started to write a novel when he was 26, parts of which found their way into The Savage Crows, but for Drewe the major career change occurred when he was 29. Since the early 1970s Drewe has returned to journalism only briefly to earn money to keep himself and his family going. Yet he had built a successful career in journalism in a number of newspapers and magazines including The West Australian (1961–64), The Age (1964–70), The Australian (1970–74) and The Bulletin (1975–76 and 1980–83).
Drewe won three major national awards including the Walkley Award (twice), Australia's version of the Pulitzer Prize. His experience ranged from investigative reporter to literary editor and columnist. From his period with the Australian on, Drewe set his sights on becoming a fiction writer (a first abortive novel had been written while he was with the Age). His occasional returns to journalism in the 1970s and 1980s were increasingly difficult and, in his words, "soul-destroying."

Birth of a novelist, death of a journalist by David Conley

Robert Drewe is Australia's most prominent journalist-novelist in that he has won awards for reportage and fiction. He has won two Walkley Awards (1976, 1981) and written five novels and two
books of short stories, including The Bodysurfers, which became a TV mini-series. Fortune (1987) won the National Book Council's Banjo Award for fiction. It can be argued journalism helped prepare him
for fiction and made him a better, and certainly a different, novelist than he otherwise would have been. Drewe undertook a cadetship with the West Australian on his 18th birthday and credits the profession with educating him. Becoming a journalist seemed a romantic notion. It offered travel and adventure while he was being paid for it (Hart 1988, p. 5). “Unless you have a family fortune, like one or two prominent writers, you
have to do something to make a living, and being a cub reporter . . . is a better training ground than most”

"Robert Drewe’s Australias – with particular reference to the bodysurfers" by John Thieme

Few contemporary Australian writers have explored the changing nature of the country's social mores to a greater extent than Robert Drewe. Ever since his first novel, The Savage Crows (1976), Drewe's fiction has interrogated conceptions of a unitary national identity such as that projected by the Australian legend, with its emphasis on the bush, mateship and Anglo-Celtic origins.

“The lesson of the "yellow sand": Robert Drewe's dissection of "the good old past" in “The Drowner” and “Grace”” By Michael Ackland

Robert Drewe’s investment in the past and history is much commented on but not always understood. Its very obviousness, together with the variety of subjects chosen, has deflected attention away from the evolving, subtly changing nature of his response to the historical record. This has, of course, ranged from the adversarial to the nostalgic and elegiac, and a similar diversity characterises the historical sources drawn on for his major fiction, beginning with genocide in Tasmania and Australia’s place in the Asia-Pacific region, through the making of national fold-heroes, to an autobiography and stories based on his early life in Perth.

"The Diviner" by Murray Waldren

He has always specialised in precise texts of straightforward but expressive prose, tinged with traces of black humour. In literature, his world is one in which characters barely comprehend what is happening around them, where life and nature verge on the malevolent, where shards of sudden insight illuminate the confusion. One of his strengths is an ability to pin down the fine detail of how people interact, socially and emotionally, to capture the nuance and undercurrents that exist beneath conversations.

"Desert Drowning" by Michael Cathcart

This is a sad, sexy and visceral novel. It is buoyed up by compassion and a clear-sighted lack of self-indulgence. This is Drewe at his very best: the world of a mature craftsman writing with cool urgency and a relish for the language of life.

Personal life
Drewe has six children from three marriages. (A son died in 2019.) He and his wife Tracy divide their time between  the New South Wales north coast and North Fremantle, Western Australia.

Adaptations in other media

Bibliography

Novels
The Savage Crows (1976) 
A Cry in the Jungle Bar (1979) 
Fortune (1986) 
Our Sunshine (1991) 
The Drowner (1996) 
The Shark Net (2000) 
Grace (2005) 
Whipbird (2017) 
Nimblefoot (2022)

Short story collections
The Bodysurfers (1983) 
The Bay of Contented Men (1989) 
The Rip (2008) 
The True Colour of the Sea (2018)

Non-fiction
Walking Ella: A Dog Day Dossier (1998)  (later Walking Ella: Ruminations of a Reluctant Dog-walker )
The Shark Net: Memories and Murder (2000) 
The Seventh Wave: Photographs of Australian Beaches (with Trent Parke) (2000) 
Perth (with Frances Andrijich and Jeff Bell) (2005) 
Sand (with John Kinsella) (2010) 
Montebello: A Memoir (2012) 
The Local Wildlife (2013) 
Swimming to the Moon (2014) 
The Beach: An Australian Passion (2015)

Drama
 The Bodysurfers: The Play (1989)
South American Barbecue (1991)

As editor
The Picador Book of the Beach (1993)  (later The Penguin Book of the Beach )
The Penguin Book of the City (1997) 
Best Australian Stories 2006 (2006) 
Best Australian Stories 2007 (2007) 
Best Australian Essays 2010 (2010)

Appearances

References

External links
Penguin Books author profile
Guide to the Papers of Robert Drewe
A Guide to Robert Drewe

Living people
20th-century Australian novelists
20th-century Australian male writers
21st-century Australian novelists
Australian male novelists
Australian male short story writers
Journalists from Melbourne
20th-century Australian short story writers
21st-century Australian short story writers
21st-century Australian male writers
1943 births